A Mini-Neptune  (sometimes known as a gas dwarf or transitional planet) is a planet less massive than Neptune but resembling Neptune in that it has a thick hydrogen–helium atmosphere, probably with deep layers of ice, rock or liquid oceans (made of water, ammonia, a mixture of both, or heavier volatiles).

A gas dwarf is a gas planet with a rocky core that has accumulated a thick envelope of hydrogen, helium, and other volatiles, having, as a result, a total radius between 1.7 and 3.9 Earth radii.

Properties
Theoretical studies of such planets are loosely based on knowledge about Uranus and Neptune. Without a thick atmosphere, it would be classified as an ocean planet instead. An estimated dividing line between a rocky planet and a gaseous planet is around 1.6–2.0 Earth radii. Planets with larger radii and measured masses are mostly low-density and require an extended atmosphere to simultaneously explain their masses and radii, and observations show that planets larger than approximately 1.6 Earth-radius (and more massive than approximately 6 Earth-masses) contain significant amounts of volatiles or H–He gas, likely acquired during formation. Such planets appear to have a diversity of compositions that is not well-explained by a single mass–radius relation as that found for denser, rocky planets. 

The lower limit for mass can vary widely for different planets depending on their compositions; the dividing mass can vary from as low as one to as high as 20 . Smaller gas planets and planets closer to their star will lose atmospheric mass more quickly via hydrodynamic escape than larger planets and planets farther out. A low-mass gas planet can still have a radius resembling that of a gas giant if it has the right temperature.

Neptune-like planets are considerably rarer than sub-Neptunes, despite being only slightly bigger. This "radius cliff" separates sub-Neptunes (radius < 3 Earth radii) from Neptunes (radius > 3 Earth radii). This is thought to arise because, during formation when gas is accreting, the atmospheres of planets of that size reach the pressures required to force the hydrogen into the magma ocean, stalling radius growth. Then, once the magma ocean saturates, radius growth can continue. However, planets that have enough gas to reach saturation are much rarer, because they require much more gas.

Examples
The smallest known extrasolar planet that might be a gas dwarf is Kepler-138d, which is less massive than Earth but has a 60% larger volume and therefore has a density ) that indicates either a substantial water content or possibly a thick gas envelope. However, more recent evdence suggests that it may be more dense than previously though, and could be an ocean planet instead.

See also 
 Chthonian planet
 Hot Jupiter
 Hot Neptune
 Mega-Earth
 Planet Nine
 Super-Earth
 Super-Jupiter

References

Further reading
Six New Planets: Mini-Neptunes Found Around Sunlike Star, Victoria Jaggard, National Geographic News, Published February 2, 2011

External links
Super-Earths or Mini-Neptunes?

Exoplanets